Gautam Gulati (born 27 November 1987) is an Indian film and TV actor known for his comic roles in Pyaar Kii Ye Ek Kahaani and Diya Aur Baati Hum. In 2014, he participated in the reality show Bigg Boss 8 and emerged as the winner. He appeared in Rakesh Mehta's short film Darpok, which was screened at the 67th Cannes Film Festival, and in Siddhartha-The Buddha where he played the role of Devadutta. He played Indian cricketer Ravi Shastri in Mohammad Azharuddin's biopic Azhar. His last project was Behen Hogi Teri, where he played the role of Rahul. In 2019 he portrayed the role of a RAW Agent in Operation Cobra, a web series on Eros Now.

Early life
Gulati was born on 27 November 1987 and he hails from Delhi.

Career
Gulati started his acting career in television with the 2008 series Kahaani Hamaaray Mahaabhaarat Ki where he played Duryodhana. He later played one of the supporting roles in Zee TV's Kasamh Se and played Varun which was by Ekta Kapoor. Later in the same year he played Tejj in Star Plus show Tujh Sang Preet Lagai Sajna.

In 2010 he was selected to play a gay character Shaurya Khanna in Star One's Pyaar Kii Ye Ek Kahaani. From 2011 to 2014, he played Vikram Rathi in Star Plus' longest running show Diya Aur Baati Hum. In September 2014, he participated in the reality show Bigg Boss in its eighth season as a celebrity contestant. He survived for 19 weeks until he emerged as the winner.

In 2015, Gulati hosted a show named MTV Big F. He later made his entry in Bollywood with the film Azhar which released in April 2016.

Filmography

Television

Films

Web series

Music videos

Awards and nominations

References

External links

 
 

Living people
1987 births
21st-century Indian male actors
Indian male soap opera actors
Indian male film actors
Indian male television actors
Indian television presenters
Bigg Boss (Hindi TV series) contestants
Big Brother (franchise) winners
Male actors from Delhi